Richard Francis Needham, 6th Earl of Kilmorey,  (born 29 January 1942), usually known as Sir Richard Needham, is a British Conservative politician. A Member of Parliament from 1979 to 1997, he served as Under-Secretary of State for Northern Ireland between 1985 and 1992 and as Minister of State for Trade between 1992 and 1995. From January 1961 until April 1977, he was entitled to use the courtesy title Viscount Newry and Mourne.

Early life
Needham is eldest of the three sons of Patrick Needham, 5th Earl of Kilmorey by his marriage to Helen Bridget Faudel-Phillips, a daughter of Sir Lionel Faudel-Phillips, 3rd and last Baronet. He was educated at Eton. When his father succeeded as the 5th Earl of Kilmorey in January 1961, Needham became entitled to use the courtesy title Viscount Newry and Mourne, or Lord Newry. In April 1977 he succeeded his father and became the 6th Earl.

Political career
Needham was a member of the Somerset County Council between 1967 and 1974. In 1974, he stood unsuccessfully for parliament for the safe Labour seat of Pontefract and Castleford in the February general election, and was then also defeated at the more marginal Gravesend in October. 
He succeeded his father to the earldom in 1977. This is an Irish peerage and did not bar him from sitting in the House of Commons. At the 1979 general election, he was returned as Member of Parliament for Chippenham in Wiltshire. He was one of the "Wiltshire Wets", Conservative MPs from the county who expressed concern at the perceived loss of jobs resulting from the "monetarist" policies of Margaret Thatcher; in 1990 he called Thatcher "a cow" in a leaked telephone conversation with his wife. His constituency was abolished for the 1983 general election, when he was returned to the House of Commons for the new North Wiltshire constituency. He held the seat until he retired from Parliament at the 1997 general election.

In Government

Needham was Parliamentary Private Secretary to the Secretary of State for Northern Ireland, James Prior, between 1983 and 1984, and to the Secretary of State for the Environment, Patrick Jenkin, between 1984 and 1985. He served under Thatcher and later John Major as an Under-Secretary of State for Northern Ireland between 1985 and 1992 and under Major as Minister of State for Trade between 1992 and 1995, and was instrumental in transforming Northern Ireland's economic base and the UK's export strategy under Michael Heseltine. He was the longest serving British government Northern Ireland minister.

Books

Lord Kilmorey has written three books: Honourable Member and Battling for Peace: Northern Ireland's Longest-Serving British Minister (1999); an account of his years in Northern Ireland and his contribution to peace. and One Man Two Worlds (2021) a memoir of his life in politics and business

Honours
Lord Kilmorey holds an honorary degree of Doctor of Laws from the University of Ulster. A founder member of the UK-Japan 21st Century Group, he was appointed a member of the Order of the Rising Sun, Gold and Silver Star, by the Emperor of Japan.He was appointed the Order of San Carlos by Juan Manuel Santos, President of Colombia for his work on the Peace Process in Colombia. 
He was made a Privy Counsellor in 1994 and knighted in 1997.

Personal life
Needham married Sigrid Thiessen-Gairdner, daughter of Ernst Thiessen, in 1965. They have three children:

Robert Francis John Needham, Viscount Newry and Mourne (b. 1966)
Hon. Andrew Francis Needham (b. 1969)
Lady Christina Clare Needham (b. 1977)

Although Needham inherited the Earldom of Kilmorey and Viscountcy of Newry and Mourne on the death of his father in 1977, he did not petition the House of Lords to formally claim succession until October 2012. According to his biography he opted not to use the title as he did not inherit any money with it.  The Needham estate, known as Mourne Park, is near Kilkeel in County Down in Northern Ireland but the title and estate were separated when the fifth Earl inherited the title but opted to live in England. The Needham estate or Mourne Park is now owned by the Anley family, descendants of the 4th Earl of Kilmorey. The house was badly damaged by fire on 18 May 2013.

References

External links
 
geni.com

1942 births
People educated at Eton College
Knights Bachelor
Living people
Members of the Privy Council of the United Kingdom
Conservative Party (UK) MPs for English constituencies
Recipients of the Order of the Rising Sun
UK MPs 1979–1983
UK MPs 1983–1987
UK MPs 1987–1992
UK MPs 1992–1997
Kilmorey, E6
Northern Ireland Office junior ministers
Kilmorey, Richard Needham, 6th Earl of